Musique pour l'Odyssée (French: Music for the Odyssey) is the second album by Art Zoyd, released in 1979 through Atem Records. In 1992, Musique pour l'Odyssée would be reissued as a double compact disc with Symphonie pour le jour où brûleront les cités, Génération sans futur and Archives 1.

Track listing

Personnel 
Art Zoyd
Michel Berckmans – oboe, bassoon
Franck Cardon – violin
Daniel Denis – percussion
Gérard Hourbette – viola
Jean-Pierre Soarez – trumpet
Michel Thomas – saxophone
Thierry Zaboitzeff – cello, bass guitar, vocals
Production and additional personnel
Art Zoyd – production, mixing
Patrice Jean Baptiste – illustrations
Pierre Desmedt – mixing, recording
Eric Faes – recording

References

External links 
 

1979 albums
Art Zoyd albums